

Location

Nevado Juncal is a mountain at the border of Argentina and Chile, at the head of Aconcagua Val. It's located at La Yesera, Los Andes Department, Valparaíso Region, at the Central Andes. The mountain hosts several glaciers including the Juncal Norte and Juncal Sur.

Elevation

It has an official height of 5965 meters Based on the elevation provided by the available Digital elevation models, SRTM2 (5940m), ASTER (5918m), TanDEM-X(5905m with voids), Juncal is about 5953 meters above sea level.

The height of the nearest key col is 5120 meters, so its prominence is 833 meters. Juncal is listed as subgroup or massif, based on the Dominance system  and its dominance is 13.99%. Its parent peak is Nevado del Plomo and the Topographic isolation is 6.6 kilometers. This information was obtained during a research by Suzanne Imber in 2014.

External links
Elevation information about Juncal
Weather Forecast at Juncal
 Nevado Juncal on Mountain-forecast

References

Mountains of Argentina
Mountains of Chile
Mountains of Valparaíso Region
Mountains of Mendoza Province
Argentina–Chile border
International mountains of South America
Five-thousanders of the Andes
Principal Cordillera